= Y Cwmwl =

19th-century Welsh publication

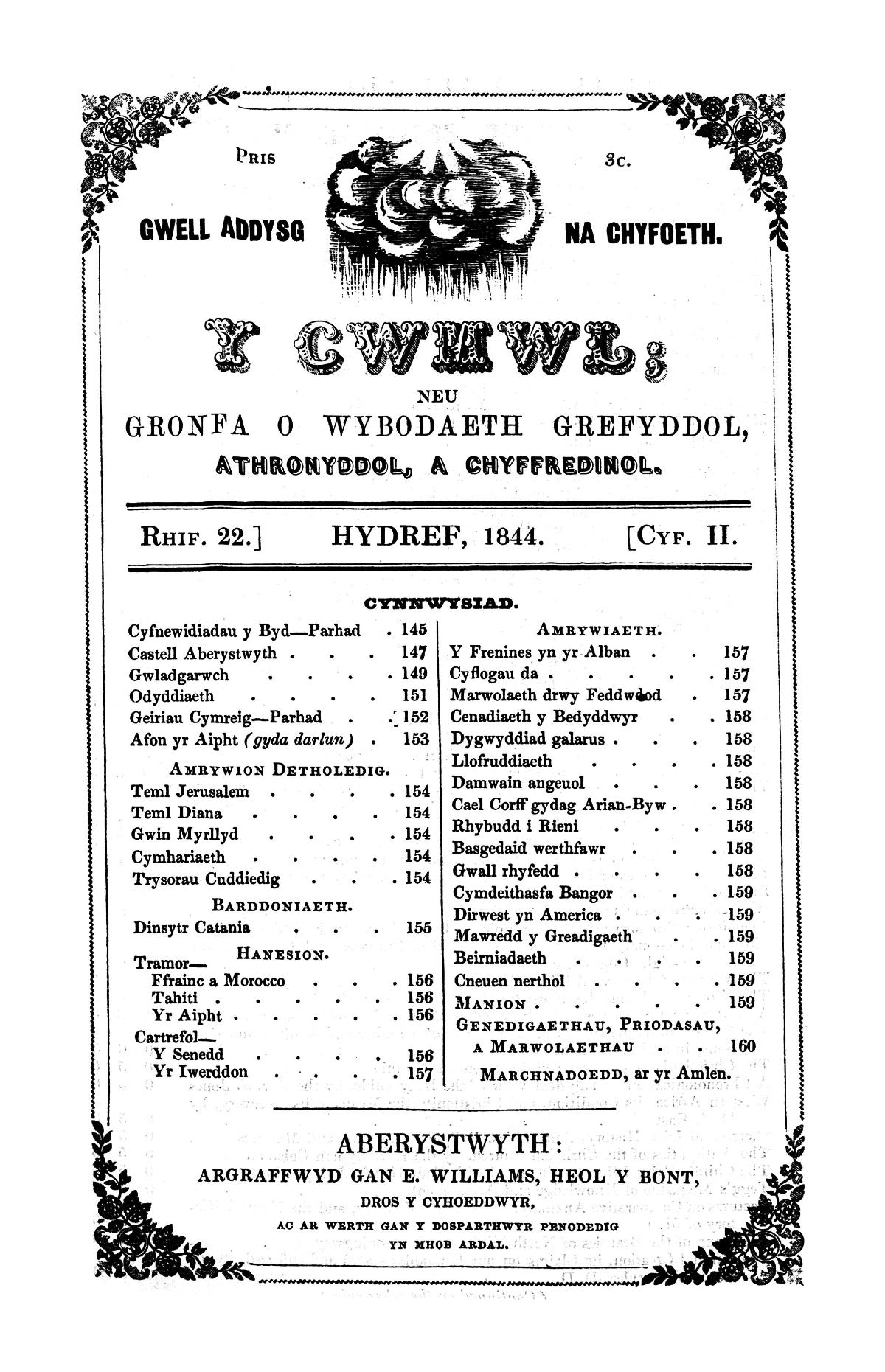
Y cwmwl (Welsh Journal)

Y Cwmwl was a 19th-century Welsh language monthly magazine, first published in Aberystwyth in 1843, by Joseph Roberts, Hugh Hughes, David Jones and John Jones. Printer and translator Robert Jones (Adda Fras, 1809–1880) was the magazine's editor.

The magazine contained non-denominational religious articles, and others on philosophy and current affairs, and also poetry and biographies.
